Gernet  may refer to:

Jacques Gernet (1921–2018), French sinologist 
Louis Gernet (1882–1962), French philologist and sociologist
Mikhail Nikolaevich Gernet (1874–1953), Soviet criminologist and legal historian